This is the second of three pages that lists all of the High School athletic conferences located in state of Indiana under the Indiana High School Athletic Association (IHSAA).

Indiana's Class System
Indiana's classes are determined by student enrollment, broken into classes of roughly equal size depending on sport. The 2011-12 school year marks a change in the classification period, as schools are reclassified in all class sports biennially instead of quadrennially.

It is also important to note that some schools (mostly private) are placed in classes higher than their enrollment. This is due to a new IHSAA rule that took effect for the 2012-13 year that dictates that school that wins two state championships in a row is automatically moved up into the next class.

Classes for 2020-21 through 2022-23:
Most sports:
Class A:  <325 Students.
Class AA: 325-565 Students.
Class AAA: 566-1089 Students.
Class AAAA: >1089 Students.

Football:
Class A: <418 students
Class AA: 418-591 students
Class AAA: 592-849 students
Class AAAA: 850-1499 students
Class AAAAA: 1500-2099 Students
Class AAAAAA: >2100 Students 

Soccer:
Class A: <499 students
Class AA: 500-1000 students
Class AAA: >1000 Students

Explanation of colors

 Schools that do not play football. 
 Schools that are affiliate members for certain sports. 
 Private or parochial schools.
 Military Academies.
 Public Magnet Schools.
 Public schools that draw from multiple counties.
 Public schools that draw from multiple time zones 
 Out of state schools. (e.g. Mount Carmel) 
Conferences without State Locator Maps are entirely in one county. County Name and City(s) are listed above chart.

Mid-Eastern Conference

Mid-Hoosier Conference

Schools in green play football in the Mid-Indiana Football Conference, except for independent Edinburgh

Mid-Indiana Football Conference

Mid-Southern Conference

Mid-State Conference

Midwest Athletic Conference

The Midwest Conference is expected to disband in 2015 with most members joining the newly organized Hoosier North Athletic Conference.

North Central Athletic Conference

Northeast Corner Conference

Northeast Hoosier Conference

Northern Indiana Athletic Conference

Northern Lakes Conference

Northern State Conference

1 New Prairie High is located on the LaPorte / St. Joseph county line.

Northwest Crossroads Conference

Northwestern Conference
45 Lake County 
Gary, Indiana

See also 
 Page 1: Allen County Conference - Metropolitan Interscholastic Conference
 Page 3: Ohio River Valley Conference - Western Indiana Conference

References

External links 
 IHSAA Conferences
 IHSAA Directory